Porter Houses and Armstrong Kitchen is a set of two historic homes and a kitchen building located near Whitakers, Edgecombe County, North Carolina. The first Porter dwelling dates to the last quarter of the 18th century, and is a -story frame dwelling with a gambrel roof. It was restored in 1994. The second Porter dwelling also dates to the last quarter of the 18th century, and is a one-room, -story frame dwelling with a gable roof.  It measures approximately 16 feet wide and 24 feet long.  Also on the property is a frame kitchen building built about 1850 and remodeled about 1900.

It was listed on the National Register of Historic Places in 2002.

References

Houses on the National Register of Historic Places in North Carolina
Houses in Edgecombe County, North Carolina
National Register of Historic Places in Edgecombe County, North Carolina